The XXV Reserve Corps was a corps level command of the German Army in World War I.

Formation 
XXV Reserve Corps was formed in October 1914. It was part of the first wave of new reserve units formed at the outset of World War I; consisting of XXII to XXVII Reserve Corps and 43rd to 54th Reserve Divisions (plus the 6th Bavarian Reserve Division). It was still in existence at the end of the war in the 3rd Army, part of the Army Group German Crown Prince on the Western Front.

Structure on formation 
On formation in October 1914, XXV Reserve Corps consisted of two divisions, thus weaker than a regular Army Corps:
Reserve Infantry regiments consisted of three battalions but only had a machine gun platoon (of 2 machine guns) rather than a machine gun company (of 6 machine guns).
Reserve Jäger battalions did not have a machine gun company on formation, though some were provided with a machine gun platoon. 
Reserve Cavalry detachments were much smaller than the Reserve Cavalry regiments formed on mobilisation. 
Reserve Field Artillery regiments consisted of three  (2 gun and 1 howitzer) of three batteries each, but each battery had just 4 guns (rather than 6 like the regular or older reserve regiments).

In summary, XXV Reserve Corps mobilised with 26 infantry battalions, 10 machine gun platoons (20 machine guns), 2 cavalry detachments, 18 field artillery batteries (72 guns) and 2 pioneer companies.

Commanders 
XXV Reserve Corps had the following commanders during its existence:

See also 
German Army order of battle, Western Front (1918)

References

Bibliography 
 
 
 
 
 

Corps of Germany in World War I
Military units and formations established in 1914
Military units and formations disestablished in 1918